, a former Abbot of Nanzen-ji, was a Japanese Rinzai master well known for his commentary on the Mumonkan. One of his better-known students was Keido Fukushima, abbot of Tōfuku-ji. Shibayama also taught at Otani University and was the head abbot of the entire Nanzenji Organization, overseeing the administration of over five hundred temples.
Due to a number of lecture tours he undertook to the United States in the 1960s, and the translation of several of his books into English, Shibayama was a significant contributor to the establishment of Zen in America.

See also
Buddhism in Japan
List of Rinzai Buddhists

Bibliography

Notes

References

Zen Buddhism writers
Rinzai Buddhists
Zen Buddhist abbots
Japanese Zen Buddhists
Japanese Esperantists
1894 births
1974 deaths
20th-century Buddhist monks